Đenić (also transliterated Djenić) is a Serbian surname. It may refer to:

 Dejan Đenić (born 1986), Serbian football striker
 Petar Đenić (born 1977), Serbian football midfielder

See also
 Denice (given name)

Serbian surnames